Thomas Blane Robertson (July 25, 1917 – May 3, 1998) was an American football center.

Robertson was born in Oklahoma in 1917 and attended Duncan High School in Duncan, Oklahoma. He played college football at Kansas, LSU, and Tulsa. 

He played professional football for the Brooklyn Dodgers in the National Football League in 1941 and 1942 and for the New York Yankees of the All-America Football Conference in 1946. He appeared in 34 games for the Dodgers and Yankees, 21 of them as a starter.

He died in 1998 in Tulsa, Oklahoma.

References

1917 births
1998 deaths
American football centers
Brooklyn Dodgers (NFL) players
New York Yankees (AAFC) players
Kansas Jayhawks football players
LSU Tigers football players
Tulsa Golden Hurricane football players
Players of American football from Oklahoma